Greater Kelowna (officially known as Kelowna Census Metropolitan Area) is a metropolitan area in British Columbia, the third largest in British Columbia and the largest in the interior. It's the fastest growing metropolitan area within B.C and the fifth fastest growing in all of Canada.

The term "Greater Kelowna" is roughly coterminous with the geographic area governed by the Central Okanagan Regional District.

Municipalities  
Cities 
Kelowna (Pop. 144,576) 
West Kelowna (Pop. 36,078) 
District Municipalities 
Lake Country (Pop. 15,817) 
Peachland (Pop. 5,789) 
Regional District Electoral Areas 
Central Okanagan (Pop. 4,258) 
Central Okanagan West (Pop. 2,897) 
Indian Reserves 
Tsinstikeptum 9 (Pop. 9,134) 
Duck Lake 7 (Pop. 1,847) 
Tsinstikeptum 10 (Pop.1,766)

References

Metropolitan areas of British Columbia